Revis was an American post-grunge band. Revis may also refer to:

Revis (surname)
Revis Hill Prairie Natural Area in Mason County, Illinois, U.S.
Beth Revis, American author of fantasy and science fiction
Darrelle Revis (born 1985), American football cornerback
Eric Revis (born 1967), American jazz bassist and composer